Abdul Masih or Abdelmassih (English: servant of the Messiah) is a male given name or surname used by Arabic-speaking Christians. 

It may refer to:

 Abd al-Masih ibn Ishaq al-Kindi, author of the medieval dialogue Apology of al-Kindy
 Abd-al-Masih (martyr) (died 390), Syrian Christian saint
 Abd-al-Masih (martyr), also called Qays al-Ghassani, (died 9th century), Eastern Orthodox saint
 Ignatius Abdul Masih I, Syriac Orthodox Patriarch of Antioch, 1662–1686, preceding Ignatius George II
 Abdul Masih (missionary) (1776–1827), Indian Christian missionary
 Abd al-Masih Salib al-Masudi (1848–1935), Egyptian monk and author
 Ignatius Abdul Masih II, (1854–1915), Syriac Orthodox Patriarch of Antioch, 1895–1903
 Abd al-Masih Haddad (1890–1963), writer of the Mahjar movement and journalist
 Abdel Messih El-Makari (1892–1963), Egyptian Coptic Orthodox monk and priest
 Halim Abdul Messieh El-Dabh (born 1921), Egyptian-American musician
 Roger Abdelmassih (born 1943), Brazilian physician
 Matt Abdelmassih (born 1985), American men's basketball assistant coach (Nebraska, St. John's, Iowa State)